Bhoomi Thayiya Chochchala Maga is a 1998 Indian Kannada-language drama film directed and written by Rajendra Singh Babu. It features Shiva Rajkumar and Ramesh Aravind along with Vijayalakshmi and Shilpa in other pivotal roles. The film won several laurels and awards upon release including the Karnataka State Film Awards. The film featured an original score and soundtrack composed and written by V. Manohar.

Lokesh's character was inspired by Dashrath Manjhi, who cut a rocky hill for 22 years to build a road in memory of his dead wife. However, in the film, instead of building a road through a mountain, the character dismantles a mountain piece-by-piece to build a dam.

Cast 
 Shiva Rajkumar as Karna
 Ramesh Aravind as Bharath Kumar
 Vijayalakshmi as Sapna Sagar
 Shilpa as Nilambika
Sabyasachi Chakrabarty as Channabasappa
 Lokesh as Kallanna
 Rangayana Raghu as Patil
 Girija Lokesh as a villager
 Shankar Ashwath as Gurubasya
 Karibasavaiah as villager
 M. V. Vasudeva Rao as C. S. Narasimha Murthy
 G. K. Govinda Rao as Chief Minister
 Honnavalli Krishna as Krishna

Soundtrack 
The music was composed by V. Manohar.

Reception 
Srikanth Srinivasa of Deccan Herald felt the film was inspired by two events: "the recent spate of farmers' suicides in North Karnataka due to crop failure" and Kannada poet D. R. Bendre's poem with the same title as the film. Calling Shiva Rajkumar's performance his "best... till date", he wrote, "Shivanna is restrained and collected and delivers his dialogues effectively." He added, "Ramesh is superb. Vijayalakshmi, as the new, chirpy young thing, has performed well in the small and meaty role. Shilpa is good, as usual. Veteran Bengali actor Sabi Sachi steals the show." He commended the music and the film's soundtrack, while singling out Rajkumar's "soulful rendering of Bendre's title song" in that it "evokes a lot of sympathies while delving into the plight of the farmers overburdened by huge debts besides struggling for their daily existence." While he felt that the film could have been edited and trimmed by 15 to 20 minutes, "it provides good entertainment fare for the viewer."

Awards
1998–99 Karnataka State Film Awards
 Special Film of Social Concern
 Best Story Writer – Rajendra Singh Babu
 Best Dialogue Writer – S. Surendranath

References

External links 
 

1998 films
1990s Kannada-language films
1990s action drama films
Films directed by Rajendra Singh Babu
Indian action drama films
Films scored by V. Manohar
1998 drama films